Miss Turks and Caicos is a national Beauty pageant in Turks & Caicos.

History
The Miss Turks and Caicos Universe Beauty Organization is owned by Kazz Forbes. The Miss Turks and Caicos Islands Beauty Pageant was first held in 1979. Forbes held a two-year memorandum of understanding with the Turks and Caicos Islands Tourist Board. He did not wish to renew after its tenure. 

In 2016, the Miss Turks and Caicos Pageant had new organizers. To date, the Miss Turks and Caicos Beauty Pageant was last managed by Olincia Misick; however, she was unsuccessful in producing a national or international pageant title.

Titleholders

Big Four pageants representatives
The Turks and Caicos Islands have been represented in the Big Four international beauty pageants; the four major international beauty pageants for women. These are Miss World, Miss Universe, Miss International and Miss Earth.

Miss Turks and Caicos Universe

The winner of Miss Turks and Caicos represents her country at the Miss Universe. On occasion, when the winner does not qualify (due to age) for either contest, a runner-up is sent.

References

External links
Official website
Official website
Official page

Turks and Caicos
Beauty pageants in the Turks and Caicos Islands
Awards of British Overseas Territories
1979 establishments in the United Kingdom